Estadio Cándido González is a multi-use stadium in Camagüey, Cuba.  It is currently used mostly for baseball games and is the home stadium of Camagüey.  The stadium holds 14,000 people.

References

Baseball venues in Cuba
Estadio Candido Gonzalez